"Sea Lion" is a song by Sage Francis released as a 12" single. The song is taken from the album A Healthy Distrust.

Track listing

Songs about mammals
2005 singles
Sage Francis songs